Pallacanestro Bellinzona (in English: Bellinzona Basket)  is a Swiss professional basketball team of Bellinzona, in the canton of Ticino. The club plays its home games at the indoor stadium of Bellinzona that has a capacity of about 4,000 spectators.

History 
The team enjoyed its glory days in the mid-90s when under the leadership of Joe Whelton won three consecutive national championships and four consecutive Swiss Cups.

Titles and achievements 

Swiss League
 Winners (3): 1992-93, 1993–94, 1994–95
Swiss Cup
 Winners (4): 1992-93, 1993–94, 1994–95, 1995-96

Notable coaches
To appear in this section a player must have either:
- Won an award or title as head coach of a professional team
- Coached a national team
  Gianluca Barilari

External links 
 Pallacanestro Bellinzona history

Basketball teams established in 1948
Basketball teams in Switzerland
Organisations based in Bellinzona